Elina Vaseva (born August 21, 1986 in Kyustendil) is an amateur Bulgarian freestyle wrestler, who played for the women's middleweight category. She won the bronze medal for her division at the 2010 European Wrestling Championships in Baku, Azerbaijan. She is also a member of Yunak-Lokomotiv Wrestling Club in Ruse, and is coached and trained by Simeon Shterev.

Vaseva represented Bulgaria at the 2008 Summer Olympics in Beijing, where she competed for the women's 63 kg class. She pinned Guam's Maria Dunn in the preliminary round of sixteen, before losing out the quarterfinal match to Russia's Alena Kartashova, with a two-set technical score (0–6, 1–2), and a classification point score of 1–3. Because her opponent advanced further into the final match, Vaseva offered another shot for the bronze medal by entering the repechage bouts. Unfortunately, she was defeated in the first round by Kazakhstan's Yelena Shalygina, who was able to score five points each in two straight periods, leaving Vaseva without a single point.

References

External links
Profile – International Wrestling Database
NBC Olympics Profile

Bulgarian female sport wrestlers
1986 births
Living people
Olympic wrestlers of Bulgaria
Wrestlers at the 2008 Summer Olympics
People from Kyustendil
Sportspeople from Kyustendil Province
20th-century Bulgarian women
21st-century Bulgarian women